The Tubb 2000 (also known as the T2K) rifle is a fully adjustable modular sports target rifle produced in the United States by the McMillan Brothers Rifle Company.  It was designed and endorsed by 11-time NRA Highpower Rifle and ICFRA Palma World Champion David Tubb and Rock McMillan for long-range target shooting.

The Tubb 2000's barrel can be changed by the end-user, allowing the same rifle to support various calibers. Adjustable or user-changeable features include stock, sights, hand grip, trigger. It includes a quiet shock absorbing stock instead of a loud muzzle brake.

The successor to the Tubb 2000 was launced in 2017, and is called Tubb ATR (Advanced Tactical Rifle).

References

External links
David Tubb
Tubb 2000 detail photos NRA Museum display example from the Camp Perry competition showcase

Bolt-action rifles of the United States
Shooting sports equipment